Francesca Baruzzi Farriol (born 22 July 1998) is an Argentine World Cup alpine ski racer. She competed for Argentina at the 2022 Winter Olympics.

World Cup results

Results per discipline

Standings through 7 March 2021

World Championship results

References

External links
 
 
 
 
 

1998 births
Living people
Argentine female alpine skiers
Olympic alpine skiers of Argentina
Alpine skiers at the 2016 Winter Youth Olympics
Alpine skiers at the 2022 Winter Olympics